Caelostomus sumatrensis is a species of ground beetle in the subfamily Pterostichinae. It was described by Andrewes in 1929.

References

Caelostomus
Beetles described in 1929